Psalm 49 is the 49th psalm of the Book of Psalms, beginning in English in the King James Version: "Hear this, all ye people; give ear, all ye inhabitants of the world". In the slightly different numbering system used in the Greek Septuagint version of the bible, and generally in its Latin translations, this psalm is Psalm 48. In the Vulgate, it begins "Audite haec omnes gentes". The psalm is attributed to the sons of Korah and is closely connected with the "Wisdom" or religious philosophy of ancient Israel.

The psalm forms a regular part of Jewish, Catholic, Lutheran, Anglican and other Protestant liturgies, and has been set to music.

Text

Hebrew Bible version 
The following is the Hebrew text of Psalm 49:

King James Version 
 Hear this, all ye people; give ear, all ye inhabitants of the world:
 Both low and high, rich and poor, together.
 My mouth shall speak of wisdom; and the meditation of my heart shall be of understanding.
 I will incline mine ear to a parable: I will open my dark saying upon the harp.
 Wherefore should I fear in the days of evil, when the iniquity of my heels shall compass me about?
 They that trust in their wealth, and boast themselves in the multitude of their riches;
 None of them can by any means redeem his brother, nor give to God a ransom for him:
 (For the redemption of their soul is precious, and it ceaseth for ever:)
 That he should still live for ever, and not see corruption.
 For he seeth that wise men die, likewise the fool and the brutish person perish, and leave their wealth to others.
 Their inward thought is, that their houses shall continue for ever, and their dwelling places to all generations; they call their lands after their own names.
 Nevertheless man being in honour abideth not: he is like the beasts that perish.
 This their way is their folly: yet their posterity approve their sayings. Selah.
 Like sheep they are laid in the grave; death shall feed on them; and the upright shall have dominion over them in the morning; and their beauty shall consume in the grave from their dwelling.
 But God will redeem my soul from the power of the grave: for he shall receive me. Selah.
 Be not thou afraid when one is made rich, when the glory of his house is increased;
 For when he dieth he shall carry nothing away: his glory shall not descend after him.
 Though while he lived he blessed his soul: and men will praise thee, when thou doest well to thyself.
 He shall go to the generation of his fathers; they shall never see light.
 Man that is in honour, and understandeth not, is like the beasts that perish.

Commentary 
In Jewish tradition the psalm is attributed to the sons of Korah after recognizing their father's greed for wealth as the root of his downfall, and to teach that the purpose of one's life on earth is to enhance his or her spiritual development and to prepare for the world to come.

Alexander Kirkpatrick, in the Cambridge Bible for Schools and Colleges commentary, notes that this Psalm addresses “all peoples” with a theme of common interest to all humanity: is not wealth, after all, the master-force in the world? Must not the poor tremble before its power and pay court to its splendour? In reply, "the Psalmist expresses his own faith that righteousness will be finally triumphant".

Uses

Judaism 
Psalm 49 is recited on the day of Parshat Shekalim.
It is also recited following Shacharit and Maariv in a house of mourning.
Verse 6 is found in the Foundation of Repentance, recited on the eve of Rosh Hashanah.

Book of Common Prayer
In the Church of England's Book of Common Prayer, this psalm is appointed to be read on the evening of the ninth day of the month.

Musical settings 
Heinrich Schütz wrote a setting of a paraphrase of Psalm 49 in German, "Hört zu ihr Völker in gemein", SWV 146, for the Becker Psalter, published first in 1628.

References

External links 

 
 
 Text of Psalm 49 according to the 1928 Psalter
  in Hebrew and English - Mechon-mamre
 Psalm 49 – What Money Can’t Buy text and detailed commentary, enduringword.com
 For the leader. A psalm of the Korahites. 2Hear this, all you peoples! Give ear, all who inhabit the world text and footnotes, usccb.org United States Conference of Catholic Bishops
 Psalm 49:1 introduction and text, biblestudytools.com
 Psalm 49 / Refrain: Blessed is the one who trusts in the Lord. Church of England
 Psalm 49 at biblegateway.com
 Hymns for Psalm 49 hymnary.org

049